Vadim Yuryevich Karpov (born 14 July 2002) is a Russian football player. He plays as centre-back for PFC CSKA Moscow.

Club career
He made his debut for PFC CSKA Moscow on 19 September 2019 in a Europa League game against PFC Ludogorets Razgrad at the age of 17. He was put into the main squad's starting lineup as 5 other defenders were injured. The game ended in a 1–5 loss for CSKA.

In their next game on 22 September 2019, he made his Russian Premier League debut in a 3–2 victory over FC Krasnodar.

On 7 September 2021, CSKA announced that he joined Tekstilshchik Ivanovo on loan for the 2021–22 season.

Career statistics

Club

References

External links
 
 

2002 births
People from Kotlas
Sportspeople from Arkhangelsk Oblast
Living people
Russian footballers
Russia youth international footballers
Russia under-21 international footballers
Association football defenders
PFC CSKA Moscow players
FC Tekstilshchik Ivanovo players
Russian Premier League players
Russian First League players